Nayden Todorov  (Bulgarian: Найден Тодоров; born  Plovdiv 1974) is a Bulgarian conductor.

Biography 
Todorov was born on 8 April 1974 in Plovdiv. In 1993 he graduated from the Dobrin Petkov National School of Music in Plovdiv in the piano class of Darina Kantardzhieva and trumpet class of Lilia Kovacheva-Toporcheva. As a student he founded the Plovdiv Youth Orchestra. In 1996/1997, he was invited by the Leonard Bernstein Foundation (Jerusalem) for a specialization in Israel, where he worked with Mendy Rodan, conductor of the Israel Philharmonic Orchestra.

Since 1997 Todorov has been the musical director of the Thracian Summer international festival. In 1998-1999, he became the permanent conductor of the North Israel Symphony Orchestra in Haifa. The same year he was invited to be the Artistic Advisor of the Los Angeles International Chamber Music Festival.

In 2001 he made his debut with the Sofia Philharmonic Orchestra, and from the 2004/2005 season he became its permanent guest conductor. From 2005 to 2017 he was the director of the State Opera in Ruse.

In 2017 Todorov was elected director of the Sofia Philharmonic Orchestra. Since then he has broadened the repertoire of the orchestra and brought a new calibre of soloists and guest conductors to work with it.

Recordings 
Todorov has made several hundred recordings for the Music Minus One (MMO) label. He has also recorded for the DanaCord, Hungaroton, and Naxos labels.

Education
Dobrin Petkov Music High-School
Vienna Music Seminar
Vienna Music University
Jerusalem Rubin Academy
New Bulgarian University

Teachers
Prof. Lilia Kovacheva-Toporcheva
Prof. Krastju Marev
Prof. Alexander Vladigerov
Prof. Karl Österreicher
Prof. Uros Lajovic
Prof. Günter Theuring
Prof. Peter Richter
Prof. Mendi Rodan

Scholarships
1993 – 1995  	Borghese Foundation
1995 – 1997 	St. St. Cyrill and Metody Foundation
1995 – 1997 	Rotary International, Vienna
1996 – 1998 	George Wachter Foundation, Switzerland

References

External links 
Nayden Todorov Personal website
[ Allmusic.com: Nayden Todorov - Credits]

1974 births
Living people
Bulgarian classical musicians
Bulgarian classical pianists
Bulgarian composers
Bulgarian conductors (music)
Orchestra leaders
Musicians from Plovdiv
21st-century conductors (music)
21st-century classical pianists